Tina House is a Canadian television journalist, who has been a Vancouver bureau reporter for APTN National News since 2007.

In 2010, she won the Amnesty International Canada Human Rights Journalism Award for her APTN Investigates reportage on missing and murdered Indigenous women. In 2022, she won the Canadian Screen Award for Best National Reporter at the 10th Canadian Screen Awards.

References

Canadian television reporters and correspondents
Canadian women television journalists
Canadian Screen Award winning journalists
First Nations journalists
Living people
Year of birth missing (living people)
First Nations women